Born Free and Equal: The Story of Loyal Japanese-Americans is a book by Ansel Adams containing photographs from his 1943–1944 visit to the internment camp then named Manzanar War Relocation Center in Owens Valley, Inyo County, California. The book was published in 1944 by U.S. Camera in New York.

In the summer of 1943, Adams was invited by his friend, newly appointed camp director Ralph Merritt, to photograph life at the camp. The project and the accompanying book and exhibition at the MoMA created a significant amount of controversy, partly owing to the subject matter. World War II was still being fought and the animosity against Americans of Japanese descent was high, especially on the West Coast.

Adams was not the only photographer to take pictures in Manzanar. Before him, Dorothea Lange had visited all eleven Japanese-American internment camps while a staff photographer for the War Relocation Authority. During Lange's visit in 1942, the camp was a less organized state and Lange was driven to portray the injustice of the relocation project, leading to a harsher and less optimistic portrayal of camp life than Adams's. The third photographer was internee Toyo Miyatake, previously a studio photographer in Los Angeles. Miyatake initially took photos with an improvised camera fashioned from parts he smuggled into the camp. His activity was discovered after nine months, but Merritt supported the endeavor and allowed him to have his stored studio equipment shipped to the camp and continue the project (initially a camp guard had to release the shutter for him after Miyatake had positioned the camera). Miyatake and Adams met and befriended each other at the camp, while Lange's and Adams's visits did not overlap.

Adams's goal in the project was twofold: to stress the good American citizenship of the internees, as conveyed in the subtitle of the book, "The Story of Loyal Japanese-Americans"; and to show their ability to cope with the situation:

The purpose of my work was to show how these people, suffering under a great injustice, and loss of property, businesses and professions, had overcome the sense of defeat and dispair [sic] by building for themselves a vital community in an arid (but magnificent) environment…All in all, I think this Manzanar Collection is an important historical document, and I trust it can be put to good use. (Ansel Adams, 1965.)

Adams donated his collection of Manzanar photos to the Library of Congress in 1965. In 2001, Spotted Dog Press published an updated version of Born Free and Equal with a foreword by Archie Miyatake, son of Manzanar photographer Toyo Miyatake. The new version of the book has on the front cover a photo of Joyce Okazaki (née Nakamura), one of the children Adam's photographed.

Footnotes

References
 Ansel Adams, Born Free and Equal, New York: U.S. Camera (1944); reprint: CreateSpace (2012). 
 Ansel Adams, Born Free and Equal; updated edition: Spotted Dog Press (2002). 
 Mary Street Alinder, Ansel Adams: a Biography, Owl Books (1998). 
 Judith Fryer Davidov, "'The Color of My Skin, the Shape of My Eyes': Photographs of the Japanese-American Internment by Dorothea Lange, Ansel Adams, and Toyo Miyatake", The Yale Journal of Criticism 9(2), pp. 223–244 (1996). restricted access
 Linda Gordon, and Gary Y. Okihiro (eds.), Impounded: Dorothea Lange and the Censored Images of Japanese American Internment, W.W. Norton (2206). 
 Gerald H. Robinson, Elusive Truth: Four Photographers at Manzanar, Carl Mautz Publishing (2002). 
 Jonathan Spaulding, Ansel Adams and the American Landscape: a Biography, University of California Press (1998).

External links

 Exhibit of Manzanar photographs at the U.S. Library of Congress.
 Digitalized full text edition at the U.S. Library of Congress.

1944 non-fiction books
Photographic collections and books
World War II memoirs
Books about the internment of Japanese Americans
Museum of Modern Art (New York City) exhibitions
1944 in art
Books about California
Ansel Adams